Senator Daniels may refer to:

John C. Daniels (1936–2015), Connecticut State Senate
Julie Daniels (born 1954), Oklahoma State Senate
Lori Daniels (born 1955), Arizona State Senate
Milton J. Daniels (1838–1914), Minnesota State Senate
Scott Daniels (judge) (born 1948), Utah State Senate

See also
Senator Daniel (disambiguation)